The Faculty of Humanities at Aalborg University is one of five faculties at AAU. The Faculty of Humanities consists of three departments and has approximately 4295 students and approximately 570 employees (2019). The Faculty was headed by Dean Lone Dirckinck-Holmfeld in collaboration with Associate Dean Jørgen Stigel until January 2015, when Dirckinck-Holmfeld stepped down, and Stigel became Constituted Dean, and Henrik Halkier took over as Associate Dean.

Departments under The Faculty of Humanities 
 Department of Communication and Philosophy 
 Department of Culture and Global Studies

The programs under The Faculty of Humanities 

Bachelor programs conducted in Danish
Applied Philosophy
Communication and Digital Media (Communication, Human Centered Informatics, Interactive Digital Media) (offered in AAL/CPH)
Danish
English
Experience Technology
International Business Communication (English, French, Spanish, German)
Language and International Studies, English (LISE)
Music
Music Therapy
Organizational Learning
Psychology
Spanish and International Studies
German

Master programs conducted in Danish

Applied Philosophy
Communication
Danish
English
Experience Design
German
Interactive Digital Media (IndiMedia)
IT, Learning and Processes of Change (offered in AAU/CPH)
Language and International Business Communication (English, French, Spanish, German, IT/Communication)
Learning and Organisational Adaptation
Music
Music Therapy
Persuasive Design
Psychology

Master programs conducted in English

Information Architecture (offered in AAL/CPH)
Information Studies
Culture, Communication and Globalisation
Tourism (offered in AAL/CPH)

References

External links 
 Faculty of Humanities website

Aalborg University